O Heraldo is a century-old broadsheet English-language daily newspaper published from Panjim, the state-capital of the Indian state of Goa.

History
O Heraldo was established as the first daily Portuguese newspaper on 21 May 1900 by Aleixo Clemente Messias Gomes  in Goa. After a ten-year spell in Lisbon, Messias Gomes undertook major expansions and modernisations of the paper's operations in 1919. It was later transformed into an English daily in 1983, by which time it was 'the longest-running Portuguese-language newspaper outside of Portugal and Brazil'.

The newspaper presently has 2 supplements - its daily four-pager Herald Café that is out on all days of the week except Monday and its weekly four-pager Herald Review, that accompanies the paper on Sunday.

References

External links
O Heraldo website

English-language newspapers published in India
Indian news websites
Mass media in Goa
Culture of Panaji
1900 establishments in Portuguese India